Dylan Kussman (born January 21, 1971) is an American film and television writer and actor. He played the part of Richard Cameron in the 1989 film Dead Poets Society as well as Dr. Allen Painter in The Way of the Gun in 2000. He has also appeared in such films as  Wild Hearts Can't Be Broken, Leatherheads, X2, Flight and Jack Reacher, and is the writer, director, and star of the online noir drama The Steps. He also co-wrote the screenplay for the 2017 Tom Cruise film, The Mummy. In 2019, he appeared in the Clint Eastwood film Richard Jewell.

Kussman was born and raised in Los Angeles, California. He attended the University of California, Berkeley. In 2008 he moved to Chattanooga, Tennessee.

Partial filmography 
Married... with Children (1989) episode: "A Three Job, No Income Family" - Butch
Dead Poets Society (1989) - Richard Cameron
Journey of Honor (1991) - Smitty
Wild Hearts Can't Be Broken (1991) - Clifford Henderson
93 Million Miles from the Sun (1996) - Eddie
The Way of the Gun (2000) - Dr. Allen Painter
X2 (2003) - Stryker Soldier Wilkins
House (2005) episode: "Kids" - Mr. Carroll 
Monday (2006) - Neighbor
Ten 'til Noon (2006) - Rush
Cold Case (2007) episode: "Offender" - Cliff Burrell (1987)
One Day Like Rain (2007) - Mick
Leatherheads (2008) - Soldier Frank
Jayne Mansfield's Car (2012) - Milton (uncredited)
Flight (2012) - Two Beer Barry
Jack Reacher (2012) - Gary
The Salience Project (2014) - Quincy
The Mummy (2017) - Writer Tech

References

External links 
 

American male film actors
University of California, Berkeley alumni
1971 births
Living people